Grevillea pteridifolia is a species of flowering plant in the family Proteaceae and is endemic to northern Australia. It is also known by many common names, including golden grevillea, silky grevillea, fern-leaved grevillea, golden parrot tree, golden tree, manbulu, yawuny and tjummula. It is a shrub or tree usually with pinnatisect leaves, and bright orange-yellow or reddish flowers.

Description
The edges of the leaves are rolled under, the exposed parts of the lower surface covered with silky hairs.

Plants from Queensland are non-lignotuberous shrubs to small trees with smooth bark and lighter inflorescences than other forms. Plants from Western Australia and the Northern Territory grow as a rough-barked lignotuberous shrub to small tree. A population of this last form from Kakadu National Park has all-silvery leaves.

Taxonomy
Grevillea pteridifolia was first collected by Europeans from the vicinity of the Endeavour River sometime around 10 June and again from Lookout Point around 4 August 1770 by Joseph Banks and Daniel Solander, naturalists on the Endeavour during Lieutenant (later Captain) James Cook's first voyage to the Pacific Ocean. However, the description of the species was not published until Joseph Knight described it in his 1809 work On the cultivation of the plants belonging to the natural order of Proteeae as Grevillia Pteridifolia (the "Pteris-leaved Grevillia"). The following year Robert Brown gave it the name Grevillea chrysodendron in his work Prodromus Florae Novae Hollandiae et Insulae Van Diemen. In 1870, George Bentham used Brown's name in volume 5 of his landmark publication Flora Australiensis, however it has since been reduced to synonymy with Grevillea pteridifolia as it is not the oldest published name.

Distribution and habitat
Grevillea pteridifolia is found from the Kimberley region of Western Australia, across the Northern Territory and into Queensland where it is found along the Great Dividing Range to the vicinity of Barcaldine. It is found in regions with wet summers, dry winters and  annual rainfall.

Uses and cultivation
Golden grevillea grows readily in warm climates, generally preferring extra water in summer and well-drained soils. The brittle branches can break in strong winds. Several popular garden grevilleas are hybrids between Grevillea pteridifolia and other species. Grevillea 'Sandra Gordon' is the result of crossing with G. sessilis. Grevillea 'Honey Gem' is a cross with a red form of Grevillea banksii. Similar to 'Honey Gem' is G. 'Winter Sparkles', another hybrid of G. pteridifolia and G. banksii.

The leaves were used as stuffing and as a herb when cooking emu by the Aborigines on Groote Eylandt, and used by early settlers to stuff pillows.

A series of compounds with antibacterial activity, called the kakadumycins, have been isolated from a streptomycete recovered from G. pteridifolia.

References

pteridifolia
Flora of the Northern Territory
Flora of Queensland
Eudicots of Western Australia
Proteales of Australia
Plants described in 1809